Gjøra is a village in Sunndal Municipality in Møre og Romsdal county, Norway. The village is located along the river Driva in the inner part of the Sunndalen valley. Norwegian National Road 70 runs through the village and Gjøra Chapel is also located here.

See also
Other neighboring villages in Sunndal municipality: Grøa, Hoelsand, Jordalsgrenda, Romfo, Ålvund, Ålvundeidet, and Øksendalsøra.

References

Villages in Møre og Romsdal
Sunndal